Varaždin ( or ; , also known by other alternative names) is a city in Northern Croatia,  north of Zagreb. It is mainly known for its baroque buildings, music, textile, food and IT industry.

Name
In Hungarian the town is known as Varasd, in Latin as Varasdinum and in German as Warasdin. The name Varaždin traces its origin in the word varoš, a Hungarian loanword meaning city.

Population
The total population of the city is 46,946 and it includes the following settlements:

Črnec Biškupečki, population 696
Donji Kućan, population 716
Gojanec, population 620
Gornji Kućan, population 1,139
Hrašćica, population 1,283
Jalkovec, population 1,309
Kućan Marof, population 1,388
Poljana Biškupečka, population 452
Varaždin, population 38,839
Zbelava, population 504

History

The first written reference to Varaždin, whose historical name is Garestin, was on 20 August 1181, when King Béla III mentioned the nearby thermal springs (Varaždinske Toplice) in a legal document.

Varaždin was declared a free royal borough in 1209 by the Hungarian King Andrew II. The town became the economic and military centre of northern Croatia. Due to Ottoman raids, the town was structured defensively around the old fortress, and acquired the shape of a typical medieval Wasserburg. In the early 13th century, the Knights Hospitaller came to Varaždin, where they built the church and a monastery.

At the end of the 14th century, Varaždin fortress passed to the hands of the Counts of Celje. Over the following centuries Varaždin had several owners, the most influential being Beatrice Frankopan, wife of Margrave Georg of Brandenburg-Ansbach, who built the town hall; the last was Baron Ivan Ungnad, who reinforced the existing fortification. At the end of the 16th century Count Thomas Erdődy became its owner, assuming the hereditary position of Varaždin prefects (župan), and the fortress remained in the ownership of the Erdődy family until 1925.

In 1756, the Ban Ferenc Nádasdy chose Varaždin as his official residence, and Varaždin became the capital of all of Croatia. It hosted the Croatian Sabor and the Royal Croatian Council founded by Empress Maria Theresa.

The periods of the Reformation and the counter-reformation had a great influence on Varaždin. With the arrival of the Jesuits, the school (gymnasium) and the Jesuit house were founded, and churches and other buildings were built in the Baroque style. In the 18th century Varaždin was the seat of many Croatian noblemen, and in 1756 it became the Croatian administrative centre. The fire of 1776 destroyed most of the town, resulting in the administrative institutions moving back to Zagreb.

Varaždin was the seat of Varaždin County of the Kingdom of Croatia-Slavonia within the Austro-Hungarian monarchy, ruled by the Kingdom of Hungary after the compromise of 1867. The Hungarian stamp, issued in 1881 shows both names.

By the 19th century Varaždin had been completely rebuilt and expanded, with flourishing crafts and trade, and later the manufacture of silk and bricks. The theatre, music school, and fire department were founded.

In the 20th century Varaždin developed into the industrial centre of Northwestern Croatia. The textile manufacturer Tivar was founded in 1918. On 12 July 1941, Varaždin was declared Judenfrei by the Ustaše, becoming the first city in Croatia to earn this dubious distinction. In the Croatian War of Independence, 1991, Varaždin suffered directly for only for a few days, because the huge Yugoslav People's Army base quickly surrendered, resulting in a minimal number of casualties, and providing weapons (worth $600m) for the Croatian army.

Monuments and sights

Varaždin represents the best preserved and richest urban complex in continental Croatia.

The Old Town (fortress) is an example of medieval defensive buildings. Construction began in the 14th century, and in the following century the rounded towers, typical of Gothic architecture in Croatia, were added. Today it houses the Town Museum. The fortress was depicted on the reverse of the Croatian 5 kuna banknote, issued in 1993 and 2001.

The Old and Contemporary Masters Gallery is located in the Sermage Palace, built in the rococo style in 1750.

In 1523, Margrave Georg of Brandenburg built the town hall in late baroque style, with the Varaždin coat of arms at the foot of the tower, and it has continued in its function until the present day.  There is a guard-changing ceremony every Saturday.

Varaždin's Cathedral, a former Jesuit church, was built in 1647, and is distinguished by its baroque entrance, eighteenth-century altar, and paintings.

There are many baroque and rococo palaces and houses in the town. Worth particular mention is Varaždin's Croatian National Theatre, built in 1873 and designed by the Viennese architects Herman Helmer and Ferdinand Fellner.

A baroque music festival has been held annually in Varaždin since 1971, and attracts some of the finest musicians and their fans from Croatia and the world. Recommended to visitors is also the historical street festival Špancir fest every September.

The city features its old city guard, named Purgari, in various city ceremonies as well as the weekly ceremony of the 'change of the guards' in front of the city hall. Additionally, Varaždin police officers patrol on bicycles in the warmer months.

The Old Town (Stari Grad)

The Old Town keep is one of the biggest monuments in the city of Varaždin and one of its biggest tourist attractions.  It is located in the north-western section of the city core.  Today the keep houses the Varaždin City Museum.

The keep is first mentioned in the 12th century and it is believed to be the center of Varaždin county life.  The keep underwent numerous ownership changes and reconstructions over the centuries.

The Old Town was featured on the now defunct 5 Kuna bill. On the bill, the picture is a mirror image of the actual appearance of the keep.

Churches and monasteries

Baroque palaces

Varaždin cemetery

The cemetery dates back to 1773 and it was long time an ordinary place until 1905, when Herman Haller had an idea to make it more park-like with large trees and alleys for citizens to stroll through. The reconstruction of the cemetery was done between 1905 and 1947, and its current landscape and architecture dates from these works, It is now a protected cultural and natural park.

Festivals
Špancirfest 
Varaždin Baroque Evenings
International Children and Youth Animation Film Festival VAFI, since 2010

Museums

THE OLD TOWN (STARI GRAD) Museum houses the Cultural and Historic Collection.  The Old Town Museum has been a part of the Varaždin City Museum organization since 1925.  Today is features: over 400 pieces from the glass, ceramics and clocks collection, 10 rooms furnished in chronological period style (renaissance, baroque, rococo, Empire, Biedermeier, historicism and art deco), a chapel and sacristy, and 2 rooms dedicated to two prominent men from Varaždin, Vatroslav Jagić and Ivan Kukuljević Sakcinski.
THE HERZER PALACE houses the Entomological Collection focusing on The World of Insects. There are over 4500 exhibits which clearly show the biology of bugs through several topics:In the forest, Near the forest and on the meadow, In the water and near the water, At night and underground.
THE SERMAGE PALACE houses the Gallery of Old and Contemporary Masters Art Gallery.  It is home to over 5300 works of art separated in 10 collections with works ranging from the 15th to the 20th century.

Climate
Varaždin has a warm-summer humid continental climate (Köppen climate classification Dfb) bordering on a maritime climate (Cfb).

Economy and tourism 

Varaždin is one of the few Croatian cities whose industry did not directly suffer from the war in 1991. Besides textile giant Varteks, it also has nationally important food (Vindija), metal, and construction industries. The Information Technology and financial and banking sector as are well developed. Further economic development has been encouraged with the creation of a free investment zone.

Today Varaždin is a tourist destination for the summer holidays. The city has numerous areas of interests ranging from cultural areas (reflected by many museums, galleries and theaters in the area), shopping centers in the downtown core, various sports and recreation facilities, also a rich history in cuisine. The close of the tourist season is marked by two annual festivals. The annual ŠpancirFest begins at the end of August and ends in September (lasts for 10 days). At this time the city welcomes artists, street performers, musicians and vendors for what is called "the street walking festival".

The city also hosts the Varaždin Baroque Evenings festival, first held in 1971. The festival honours baroque music and culture, both of which hold a special place in Varaždin's identity.

Varaždin is also the host of the Radar Festival, which hosts concerts at the end of summer. It has hosted artists like Bob Dylan, Carlos Santana, The Animals, Manic Street Preachers, Solomon Burke and others.

Transportation 
Apart from A4 highway that runs between Zagreb and Goričan (Hungarian border), there are three state roads that reach the area of Varaždin: D2, D3 and D35. The town is fully encircled by the Varaždin bypass. Varaždin is also a hub for bus transportation company "AP Varaždin" which offers significant number of county (local), inter-county and inter-city services, also offering international lines.

Varaždin's railway station is one of the largest and most important train stations in northern Croatia. It represents the intersection of three Croatian railway corridors that are used for both passenger and freight traffic - it lies on R201 railway (Zaprešić - Čakovec) and also represents the terminus for one local line (L201 connecting Golubovec) and one regional line (R202 connecting Dalj via Koprivnica, Virovitica and Osijek). All of the rail corridors that start, end or pass through Varaždin are single-tracked and non-electrified.

Sport

Varaždin is home to a number of professional and semi-professional sports clubs. Varaždin Arena, located near the Drava River, was one of the hosts of the 2009 World Men's Handball Championship held in Croatia.
Football: NK Varaždin, NK Varteks
Handball: RK Varteks Di Caprio, RK Koka
Basketball: KK Vindi
Volleyball: OK Varaždin
Tennis: TK Varaždin
BK Vindija
KK Varteks
Ice hockey: "KHL Varaždin"
Wrestling: "Vindija"
Water polo: "Coning"
Badminton: "BK KAJ"
Bicycling: "BD Sloga"
Track and field: "TK Marathon 95"

Education

Schools
Varaždin has seven elementary schools, 10 high schools (2 public gymnasiums, 2 private gymnasiums, trade schools, and other specialized high schools for various paths).
Varaždin 2 faculties (Faculty of Organization and Information Technology and Geotechnical faculty) that are part of the University of Zagreb and the University North.

Universities
There are 2 public universities currently operating in the city of Varaždin.
Varaždin and Koprivnica took part in establishing the University North, a public national university that operates in both cities since 2015. University of Zagreb is present in the city with 2 displaced faculties from Zagreb itself.

University North (University centre Varaždin)
Department of Economics
Department of Electrical Engineering
Department of Physiotherapy
Department of Geodesy and Geomatics
Department of Music and Media
Department of Construction
Department of Mechatronics
Department of Multimedia
Department of Public Communications
Department of Nursing
Department of Mechanical Engineering
Department of Technical and Economic Logistics

University of Zagreb
Faculty of Organization and Information Technology
Geotechnical faculty

Notable people

This list contains some of the notable people who were either born in Varaždin, lived in the city for a longer time or were in some significant way related to it.
Ivan Belostenec – linguist, lexicographer
Slavko Brankov – actor
Mirko Breyer – Croatian writer, bibliographer and antiquarian
Kristijan Đurasek – cyclist
Baltazar Dvorničić Napuly – Catholic cleric and lawyer
Ignaz Grossmann (1825–1897), rabbi
Juraj Habdelić – writer
Robert Herjavec – businessman, investor, and television personality
Hermann II of Celje – count
Saša Hiršzon (born 1972) - tennis player
Branko Ivanković – football manager
Luka Ivanušec – footballer
Vatroslav Jagić – philologist, linguist
Marija Jurić Zagorka – journalist, dramatist and novelist
Ljubomir Kerekeš – actor
Vjekoslav Klaić – writer and historian
Ferdinand Konščak – explorer, cartographer
Željko Krajan – tennis coach and former player
Ivan Kukuljević Sakcinski – historian, politician, writer
Maria Leitner - writer, journalist
Samuel Louis Mosinger – businessman and member of the "Varaždin charity society"
Miljenko Mumlek – footballer
Robert Murić – footballer
Ivan Padovec – guitar virtuoso
Franjo Rački – historian, politician and writer
Marko Rog – footballer
Radoslav Rogina – cyclist
Vjekoslav Rosenberg-Ružić – composer, conductor and music educator
Silvester Sabolčki – footballer
Tadija Smičiklas – historian and politician
Ignacije Szentmartony – theologian
Ksaver Šandor Gjalski – writer and civil servant
Karolina Šprem – tennis player
Krsto Ungnad – baron/mayor
Željko Vincek – track and field athlete
Jurica Vručina – footballer
Davor Vugrinec – footballer
Gordan Vuk – retired footballer
Johann Baptist Wanhal – composer

Twin towns – sister cities

Varaždin is twinned with:

 Bad Radkersburg, Austria
 Koblenz, Germany
 Montale, Italy
 Ptuj, Slovenia
 Ravensburg, Germany
 Schaffhausen, Switzerland
 Trnava, Slovakia

 Zalaegerszeg, Hungary

See also

Roman Catholic Diocese of Varaždin
Tentative list of World Heritage Sites in Croatia
Varaždin County (former)

Notes

Sources

External links

 varazdin.hr – Official website
 varazdin.hr/en – Official website
Varaždin City Museum – official website
eVarazdin.hr – daily city e-newspapers
Varaždin Online — News from Varaždin, up-dated daily
Varaždin Trg Kralja Tomislava Live

 
13th-century establishments in Croatia
1209 establishments in Europe
Cities and towns in Croatia
Former capitals of Croatia
Populated places in Varaždin County
Varaždin County (former)